"Old Aunt Jemima" is an American folk song written by comedian, songwriter, and minstrel show performer Billy Kersands (circa 1842–1915). The song became the inspiration for the Aunt Jemima brand of pancakes, as well as several characters in film, television, and on radio, named "Aunt Jemima".

Kersands wrote his first version of "Old Aunt Jemima" in 1875 and it became his most popular song. Author Robert Toll claimed that Kersands performed the song over 2,000 times by 1877. There were at least three different sets of "Old Aunt Jemima" lyrics by 1889.

Often, "Old Aunt Jemima" was sung while a man in drag, playing the part of Aunt Jemima, performed on stage. It was not uncommon for the Aunt Jemima character to be played by a white man in blackface. Other minstrels incorporated Aunt Jemima into their acts, so Aunt Jemima became a common figure in minstrelsy. Other songs about Aunt Jemima were written, such as "Aunt Jemima Song" and "Aunt Jemima's Picnic Day".

Lyrics
One version of "Old Aunt Jemima" began with a stanza expressing dissatisfaction with the dullness of worship services in white churches, such as a complaint about the length of the prayers. The song ended with the following two stanzas:

Some variants of the song substituted "pea-vine" for "bee line". Another version included the verse:

Sterling Stuckey maintains that Kersands did not write all of these lyrics, but adapted many of them from "slave songs" (such as field hollers and work songs).

References

Sources

American folk songs
1877 songs
Blackface minstrel characters
Blackface minstrel songs
Songs about fictional female characters
Songs about old age
Songs about farmers